The 1897–98 Northern Rugby Football Union season was the fourth season of rugby league football.

Season summary

The Lancashire Senior Competition was won by Broughton Rangers and the Yorkshire Senior Competition by Batley.

Lancashire Senior Competition
Although participating in the Lancashire Senior Competition, Runcorn and Stockport were from Cheshire.  Champions Broughton Rangers beat a team representing the rest of the Lancashire competition 5–3 in an end of season finale on 22 April 1899. Morecambe finished bottom of the competition and lost the promotion/relegation test match to Millom - winners of the Lancashire second competition - by 11 points to 3. Millom were admitted to the Senior Competition and Morecambe were admitted to the second competition.

Yorkshire Senior Competition
Champions Batley played a team representing the rest of the Yorkshire competition at Mount Pleasant on 22 April 1899 with Batley winning 3–0. The promotion/relegation test match was contested by Heckmondwike who finished bottom of the competition and Hull Kingston Rovers, winners of the no.2 competition. Hull Kingston Rovers won the match 21–3 to take Heckmondwike's place.

References

1898 in English rugby league
1899 in English rugby league
Northern Rugby Football Union seasons